The TCU Horned Frogs are an intercollegiate football team representing Texas Christian University (TCU) in the Division I Football Bowl Subdivision (FBS) of the National Collegiate Athletic Association (NCAA). The Horned Frogs have competed as a member of the Big 12 Conference since the 2012 college football season. TCU began playing football in 1896 and has played their home games since 1930 at Amon G. Carter Stadium on the TCU campus. Prior to the 2012 season, TCU was a member of the Southwest Conference (SWC) from 1923 to 1995, Western Athletic Conference (WAC) from 1996 to 2000, Conference USA (C-USA) from 2001 to 2004, and the Mountain West Conference (MWC) from 2005 to 2011.

This is a list of their annual results.

Seasons

References

TCU
TCU Horned Frogs football seasons